Smolensk State University is a university in Smolensk, Smolensk Oblast, Russia.

History
It was formed on November 7, 1918 by a decree of the Council of People's Commissars. Initially, the university combined humanitarian, natural-scientific and medical educational directions. In accordance with the government decision on the reform of higher and secondary vocational education, by order of the People's Commissariat of Education of the RSFSR of April 18, 1930, the university was reorganized into two independent institutes: the Smolensk State Pedagogical Institute of the People's Commissariat of the RSFSR and the Smolensk State Medical Institute of the People's Commissariat of the RSFSR.

On January 13, 1998, by the order of the Ministry of Education of the Russian Federation, Smolensk State Pedagogical Institute was renamed Smolensk State Pedagogical University. The modern stage of the university’s history begins on December 19, 2005 when, by the order of the Federal Agency for Education, the state educational institution of higher education “Smolensk State Pedagogical University” was renamed “Smolensk State University” (SmolSU), thus, elevating its status to a classical university.

On April 13, 2011, the organizational form of the university was changed and it became a budgetary institution.

Alumni
 Peter Fishman, sculptor

External links

 Official website. About the University

References

Smolensk State University
Educational institutions established in 1918
1918 establishments in Russia